Spinibarbus hollandi is a species of cyprinid fish endemic to Taiwan. It grows to  length.

Named in honor of zoologist-paleontologist William J. Holland (1848-1932), Director of the Carnegie Museums of Pittsburgh, in whose journal Oshima’s paper appeared.

References

Spinibarbus
Cyprinid fish of Asia
Freshwater fish of Taiwan
Endemic fauna of Taiwan
Barbs (fish)
Taxa named by Masamitsu Ōshima
Fish described in 1919